Maria Kirilenko and Flavia Pennetta were the defending champions, but Pennetta chose not to participate this year. Kirilenko partnered with Sorana Cîrstea, but lost to Julie Coin and Marie-Ève Pelletier in the quarterfinals.

Seeds

  Sorana Cîrstea /  Maria Kirilenko (quarterfinals)
  Shahar Pe'er /  Yan Zi (quarterfinals, Pe'er: foot injury)
  Raquel Kops-Jones /  Abigail Spears (champions)
  Sun Tiantian /  Aurélie Védy (first round)

Draw

External links
Draw

2009 Estoril Open - Women's Doubles
Estoril Open - Women's Doubles, 2009
Estoril Open - Women's Doubles, 2009